Faculty of Arts of Sciences may refer to:
Faculty of Arts and Sciences (Yale)
Faculty of Arts and Sciences (Queen's University)
Faculty of Arts and Science (University of Toronto)
Faculty of Arts and Sciences (Harvard)
Faculty of Arts and Sciences Building, Istanbul University